The Estadio José María Bértora is an indoor arena in Gualeguaychú, Argentina. It is primarily used for basketball and is the home arena of the Central Entrerriano. It holds 2,000 people.

References

Gualeguaychú, Entre Ríos
Jose Maria Bertora